Seyed Abbas Araghchi (born 5 December 1962 in Tehran) is an Iranian diplomat who is the former political deputy at the Ministry of Foreign Affairs of Iran from 2017 to 2021. He previously held office as the Deputy for Asia–Pacific and the Commonwealth Affairs and Legal and International Affairs of the Ministry of Foreign Affairs of Iran. He served as Iran's chief nuclear negotiator in talks with the P5+1, in Hassan Rouhani's government.

Araghchi entered the Foreign Ministry in 1989. In early 1990s, he served as chargé d'affaires of the Permanent Mission of the Islamic Republic of Iran to the Organization of Islamic Conference, based in Jeddah, Saudi Arabia.

He served as ambassador to Finland (1999-2003) and Japan (2007–2011).

Prior to becoming Ambassador, Araghchi served as Director General of the Institute for Political and International Studies (IPIS). From 2004 to 2005, he was chancellor of School of International Relations.

References

1960 births
Living people
People from Tehran
Iranian diplomats
Alumni of the University of Kent
Ambassadors of Iran to Japan
Islamic Azad University, Central Tehran Branch alumni
Spokespersons for the Ministry of Foreign Affairs of Iran
Islamic Revolutionary Guard Corps personnel of the Iran–Iraq War